Garnet Hornby Saunders (1880–1943) was a notable New Zealand shoemaker, musician, cinema proprietor and businessman. He was born in Hamley Bridge, South Australia, Australia in 1880.

References

1880 births
1943 deaths
Australian emigrants to New Zealand
New Zealand musicians